49P/Arend–Rigaux is a periodic comet in the Solar System.

The comet nucleus is estimated to be 8.48 kilometers in diameter with a low albedo of 0.028.

On 20 December 2058 the comet will pass  from Mars.

References

External links 
 49P/Arend-Rigaux – Seiichi Yoshida @ aerith.net
 Elements and Ephemeris for 49P/Arend-Rigaux – Minor Planet Center
 49P at Kronk's Cometography
 

Periodic comets
0049
Comets in 2011
Comets in 2018
19510205